Ross Medical Education Center is a private for-profit college with its headquarters in St. Clair, Michigan, and multiple additional locations in the United States. Ross was an investment of JLL Partners from 2011 until its conversion to 501(c)(3) nonprofit status in 2021; it is still classified as a for-profit institution by the U.S. Department of Education.

History 
Initial Ross Education activities began in 1969, when J.M. Ross opened a school in Flint, Michigan, under the name Learning Foundations. That school provided "after school" academic instruction to kindergarten through twelfth grade students. Six additional schools were opened from 1969 through 1971 by Mr. Ross.
In 1971, the name of the company was changed to Ross Learning, Inc., and the focus of the company shifted to providing prevocational and vocational training services to adults. Ross Learning was purchased by Howard J. Hulsman in 1973, and the organization began evolving into career training centers. In 1976, Ross opened the more comprehensive instructional services of the Ross Medical Education Centers. Throughout the 1980s and 1990s Ross Learning, Inc. opened many schools across the Midwestern and Southern United States, all of which operated as either Ross Medical Education Center, Ross Business Institute, or Ross Technical Institute.

In 2004, Mr. Hulsman sold Ross Learning, Inc. to three officers of the corporation: Christine Ossenmacher, Paul Mitchell, and Richard Lockman. In 2005, Paul Mitchell, Huron Capital Partners, LLC and minority investors formed Ross Education LLC, and purchased the assets of Ross Learning, Inc. In 2007, Ross added a Medical Insurance Billing and Office Administration program to many of its campuses. This addition is followed closely by a Dental Assistant program added in 2008.

On May 1, 2008, an acquisition was made to purchase the Institute of Medical and Dental Technology located in Cincinnati, Ohio.

Between 2008 and 2010, Ross Education, LLC. moved all of its schools into larger, brighter facilities, roughly 3 times their previous size. 
 
In 2011, the Ross Medical Education Center in Sylvania, Ohio, changed its name to Ross College. Ross College Online was created to offer associate degree programs. In 2011, Ross also became an investment of JLL Partners.

In March 2012, Ross launched its Pharmacy Technician program in seven campuses.

On June 1, 2012, the name was officially changed to Ross Medical Education Center.

Today, Ross provides Medical Insurance Billing and Office Administration and Medical Assistant training in over 30 communities throughout Indiana, Kentucky, Michigan, Ohio, Tennessee, Alabama, Iowa, and West Virginia. At several of the campus locations, the Dental Assistant, Pharmacy Technician, and Veterinary Assistant programs are also offered.

In February 2021, Ross converted from a for-profit college to a Michigan nonstock nonprofit corporation and was classified by the IRS as a 501(c)(3) public charity. The United States Department of Education has not yet made a determination as to Ross' status as a nonprofit institution for the purpose of its participation in the Title IV federal student aid programs.

Acquisitions 
In May 2008, Ross Education, LLC purchased Institute of Medical-Dental Technology. This location was renamed to Ross Institute of Medical and Dental Technology. On June 1, 2012, the name was officially changed to Ross Medical Education Center.

Later, in April 2014, Ross Education, LLC purchased Health Training Center.

In March 2015, Ross Education, LLC branched out from their healthcare training focus and purchased Michigan-based Tri-Area Trucking School. Currently, Tri-Area Trucking School has one campus located in Midland, Michigan and offers training for both Class A and B Commercial Drivers Licenses.

In January 2017, Ross purchased the remaining three campuses of Brown Mackie College.

Accreditation 
All Ross Medical Education Center campuses and Ross College are institutionally accredited by Accrediting Bureau of Health Education Schools.

Locations
Kalamazoo, Michigan 
Ann Arbor, Michigan 
Bettendorf, Iowa 
Bowling Green, Kentucky
Brighton, Michigan 
Canton, Michigan 
Charleston, West Virginia 
Cincinnati, Ohio 
Davison, Michigan 
Dayton, Ohio 
Elyria, Ohio 
Erlanger, Kentucky
Evansville, Indiana
Flint, Michigan
Fort Wayne, Indiana 
Grand Rapids, Michigan 
Granger, Indiana 
Hopkinsville, Kentucky 
Huntsville, Alabama
Johnson City, Tennessee
Kentwood, Michigan 
Knoxville, Tennessee 
Kokomo, Indiana
Lafayette, Indiana
Lansing, Michigan
Madison Heights, Michigan
Midland, Michigan
Morgantown, West Virginia 
Muncie, Indiana 
New Baltimore, Michigan
Niles, Ohio 
North Canton, Ohio 
Ontario, Ohio 
Owensboro, Kentucky
Port Huron, Michigan 
Portage, Michigan 
Roosevelt Park, Michigan
Saginaw, Michigan
Taylor, Michigan

Online education 
In 2011, Ross College began offering an online Medical Assistant Associate of Applied Science degree completion program for Ross graduates. By August 2012, Ross College launched three other online associate degree Programs. There are now five associate degree programs offered by Ross College Online.

References

External links 
 Official website

Vocational education in the United States
Private universities and colleges in Indiana
Private universities and colleges in Kentucky
Private universities and colleges in Michigan
Private universities and colleges in Alabama
Private universities and colleges in West Virginia
Private universities and colleges in Tennessee
Educational institutions established in 1976
1969 establishments in Michigan